Pintak may refer to two places in Bistrița-Năsăud County, Romania:

Pintak, the German name for Pinticu village, Teaca Commune
Pintak, the German name, and Pinták, the Hungarian name, for Slătinița village, Bistrița city